Governor of Punjab may refer to: 

 List of Governors of Punjab (British India), of the pre-independence Punjab province of British India
 List of Governors of Punjab (India), of Punjab state in India
 Governor of Punjab, Pakistan, of Punjab province in Pakistan

cs:Paňdžáb (rozcestník)
cy:Punjab
da:Punjab
de:Punjab (Begriffsklärung)
eo:Panĝabo
eu:Punjab
ko:펀자브 (동음이의)
ms:Punjab
nl:Punjab
ro:Punjab (dezambiguizare)
ru:Пенджаб
simple:Punjab
sk:Pandžáb
sh:Punjab
zh:旁遮普 (消歧义)